The Australian Suzuki Swift Series is a touring car racing category in Australia. First held in 1995, the series only went for the one season when Suzuki importers ATECO pulled its support. The 2011 and 2012 series is part of the Shannons Nationals and is managed by Trans Tasman Motorsport. The series was inspired by the successful New Zealand and Dutch Championships.

Series winners

References

 Australian Suzuki Swift Series

Touring car racing series
Swift Series
One-make series